The Racquetball - Men's Singles competition at the World Games 2013 takes place from July 26 to 28, 2013 at the Cañasgordas Club  in Cali, Colombia. Players qualified for this event from their performances at the 2012 Racquetball World Championships. 


Men's singles
Source

References

2013 World Games
2013
2013 in racquetball
Racquetball in Colombia
Racquetball at multi-sport events